Soft White is the eighth solo studio album by American rapper Mack 10. It was released on September 29, 2009 through Hoo-Bangin' Records with distribution via Fontana. Production was handled by Don Vito, Ervin "EP" Pope, DJ Green Lantern, Dow Jones, Fingazz, Fredwreck, Honorable C.N.O.T.E., Mike City, SouthBoy and Young Tre, with Roland Pole and Mack 10 serving as executive producers. It features guest appearances from Glasses Malone, Akon, Anthony Hamilton, Birdman, Jazze Pha, J. Holiday, Lil Wayne, Red Café and Rick Ross. The album debuted at number 141 on the Billboard 200, selling 3,900 copies.

The first single, "Big Balla" featuring Birdman and Glasses Malone was released September 23, 2008, but due to its lackluster reviews and chart performance it was used as a promotional single instead. "So Sharp" featuring Jim Jones and Lil Wayne was set to be a single and was released through iTunes on April 14, 2009, but Jim Jones' label did not clear his name to be used on the album. As an effort to keep the song as his first single, Mack 10 simply changed the lineup adding Rick Ross along with Jazze Pha. The lead single "So Sharp" featuring Lil' Wayne, Rick Ross and Jazze Pha became available for digital download on July 7, 2009.

Track listing

Charts

References

2009 albums
Mack 10 albums
Albums produced by Fredwreck
Albums produced by Mike City
Albums produced by DJ Green Lantern
Albums produced by Honorable C.N.O.T.E.